Nicolas Colibert, a French painter and engraver, was born in Paris in 1750. He executed in the dotted style some landscapes after Casanova, and about 1782 came to London, where he produced two oval plates of 'Pity' and 'Youth,' and two subjects from 'Evelina.' During the Revolution he returned to Paris and engraved several of Schall's designs for 'Les Amours de Psyche et de Cupidon,' published in 1791, and some illustrations after Monsiau to the poem 'La Mort d'Abel,' published in 1793. Colibert died in London in 1806.

References
 

1750 births
1806 deaths
Painters from Paris
18th-century engravers
19th-century engravers
18th-century French painters
French male painters
19th-century French painters
Landscape artists
French engravers
19th-century French male artists
18th-century French male artists